Asia Lanzi (born 9 January 2002) is an Italian skateboarder. She made her debut appearance at the Olympics representing Italy at the 2020 Summer Olympics where skateboarding was also added in Olympics for the very first time. During the 2020 Summer Olympics, she competed in women's street event.

References 

2002 births
Living people
Italian skateboarders
Italian sportswomen
Female skateboarders
Olympic skateboarders of Italy
Skateboarders at the 2020 Summer Olympics
Sportspeople from Bologna